Hydropus moserianus is a species of agaric fungus in the family Marasmiaceae. Found in the Netherlands, it was described as new to science in 1983 by Dutch mycologist Cornelis Bas. The specific epithet honours Austrian mycologist Meinhard Michael Moser. The gills are distantly spaced, numbering 12 to 16, and have a decurrent attachment to the stipe. Its spores are amyloid, and measure 8.2–11.1 by 4.2–5.7 μm.

References

External links

Marasmiaceae
Fungi described in 1983
Fungi of Europe